Larry Gunselman (born December 1, 1960) is an American former stock car racing driver and team owner. He was the owner of Max Q Motorsports, which fielded the No. 37 Chevrolet in the NASCAR Sprint Cup Series from 2009–12.

Career
Gunselman began racing in various West Coast series before moving to the Winston West Series, where he won the Most Popular Driver award in 1996. That same year, he made his NASCAR debut in the Winston Cup Series at Sonoma. He qualified 43rd and finished 36th in the No. 35 Race Stuff/Olson Technology Ford Thunderbird. He would qualify the next year, picking up sponsorship from Caterpillar, Inc. after David Green's entry failed to qualify. Gunselman attempted two races in Cup in 1998 in the No. 37 and No. 58 cars, but failed to qualify for both of them. Gunselman also was invited to compete in Japans Suzuka Thunder 100 in both 1996 and 1997.

He would return to competition in 2000 driving for Brevak Racing in the Craftsman Truck Series. He crashed out of his debut at Cicero, and had two twenty-sixth-place finishes in the next two races. In 2001, he joined MB Motorsports and picked up sponsorship from Waterloo Tool Storage. He drove seventeen races that season with a best finish of 16th at Kansas Speedway, as well as including an additional start at Texas Motor Speedway for Troxell Racing. He started out 2002 with MB, but was released after three starts due to sponsor conflicts between Waterloo Tool Storage and Sears Craftsman brand as Waterloo builds the Craftsman tool box brand. This opened the opportunity for Carl Edwards to join the Mittler Brothers team. Gunselman then took his sponsorship to DF2 Motorsports. After making a few Busch Series starts for Brian Weber, Gunselman hooked up with DF2 Motorsports and ran fourteen races with the team, his best finish a 16th at Talladega Superspeedway. He would move to Day Enterprise Racing the following season, and qualified for every race. He had an eighteenth-place finish at Talladega and finished 21st in points at season's end.

Gunselman began 2004 by running the first two races of the season for MacDonald Motorsports, Gunselman and Chris Edwards formed Mach 1 Motorsports and started competition in the 3rd  Cup race of the year at Las Vegas. Mach 1 went on to attempt all the remaining Cup races that year. Gunselman remained out of the drivers seat until the middle of the year, when he ran five races for Mach 1 Racing in the Lucas Oil Ford Taurus, where he failed to finish higher than 33rd. Gunselman sold his interest in Mach 1 to Edwards at the end of 2004. He attempted to qualify for the 2005 and 2006 Daytona 500 for Ware Racing Enterprises, but did not make either race. After spending 2007 out of the sport, he returned to the Nationwide Series in 2008 when he was hired as the driver of the No. 91 Chevy for MSRP Motorsports, but was released after ten races. Shortly afterwards, he was hired by Derrike Cope to drive his No. 74 Dodge Ram in the Truck Series, and later by Johnny Davis to drive the No. 0 Chevrolet Monte Carlo in the Nationwide Series.

Following the 2008 season, he formed Gunselman Motorsports, which fielded the start-and-park No. 64 Toyota Camry in the Sprint Cup Series for parts of three seasons. After the 2011 Daytona 500, Gunselman partnered with Front Row Motorsports to purchase the No. 37 and No. 64 teams he owned. Under Gunselman the 37 team attempted every event in 2004 with 39th place finish in the owners standings. In 2012, Gunselman fielded the No. 37 with the intent of Timmy Hill going for Rookie of the Year honors, but parked the team after one crash and five DNQs. Max Q reformed the No. 37 in July 2012 fielding Chevrolets for J. J. Yeley through a technical alliance with Tommy Baldwin Racing.

Motorsports career results

NASCAR
(key) (Bold – Pole position awarded by qualifying time. Italics – Pole position earned by points standings or practice time. * – Most laps led.)

Nextel Cup Series

Daytona 500

Nationwide Series

Craftsman Truck Series

Winston West Series

References

External links
 
 
 

Living people
1960 births
NASCAR drivers
NASCAR team owners
People from Snohomish, Washington
Racing drivers from Washington (state)